Crispus Allen is a fictional character in the DC Comics universe, mostly commonly depicted in association with Batman.

The character appeared on the first season of Gotham and was played by Andrew Stewart-Jones and by Kobna Holdbrook-Smith in Justice League, part of DC Extended Universe.

Publication history
Greg Rucka and Shawn Martinbrough created the character in Detective Comics #742 (March 2000). Allen later went on to be one of the main characters in Gotham Central. After he was killed by a corrupt police technician named Jim Corrigan (who has no connection with the Jim Corrigan who was a host of the Spectre), Allen became the third host for the Spectre.

Fictional character biography

GCPD MCU
Originally from Metropolis, Detective Crispus Allen was a fortysomething police veteran transferred to Gotham City where he was partnered with detective Renee Montoya on the Gotham City Police Department's Major Crimes Unit. Allen had a loving wife and two teenaged sons, whom he put above his job and the safety of others when Gotham was in crisis. Allen saw Batman as a necessary evil, not wanting to deal with him but tolerating his presence. Their occasional interactions illustrated his views on Batman, notably during Brian Azzarello's "Broken City" storyline. Allen was an agnostic who doubted the existence of God in spite of his family's strong faith.

Jim Corrigan
One night Allen and his partner, Renee Montoya, spotted gang members apparently preparing for some sort of violent action. Allen requested backup, but the two opted not to wait for the backup to arrive. Following the gang into a deserted building, the detectives found several murdered men as well as two large gang members. Allen tailed the suspects while Montoya scouted the rest of the building. The Black Spider suddenly appeared at the crime scene, firing upon Montoya. The first few shots hit Montoya, but she was protected by her bulletproof vest. Black Spider then aimed at her head, but Allen shot and killed the villain before he could pull the trigger.

The Internal Affairs department subsequently questioned Allen regarding the incident, confiscated his gun, and put him on temporary leave until his story could be corroborated. Complications arose when a crime scene technician named Jim Corrigan stole important evidence — a bullet of Black Spider's that struck a rival gang member — from the scene, putting Allen's career in jeopardy.

The Internal Affairs investigator in charge of Allen's case told Montoya about the missing bullet and suggested Corrigan's connection to its disappearance. Montoya found Corrigan and forced him to reveal the location of the bullet. After it was recovered, Allen was allowed to return to active duty. However, Montoya's actions destroyed an ongoing Internal Affairs investigation into Corrigan's misconduct. This left Allen angry and disappointed in her because he had secretly started his own investigation of Corrigan, which Montoya's actions also compromised. Allen continued his investigation (which took place during the events of Infinite Crisis), but Corrigan was tipped off. Corrigan found Allen's informant and beat him to death. Corrigan let Allen find the informant's body before shooting Allen in the back and killing him (in Gotham Central #38). By tampering with the evidence at the crime scene, Corrigan managed to evade prosecution. Allen's unavenged death pushed Montoya to an emotional breakdown, and she subsequently decided to quit the force in disgust at the system.

The Spectre

While Allen's body is in the morgue, the Presence forces the Spectre to accept Allen as his new host. Later, the magic users of Earth assemble at Stonehenge to call forth the Spectre and usher in the new age of magic. Allen appears in a ghostly version of his own form before making his first official transformation into the Spectre. The Spectre then kills Star Sapphire and two others for their past crimes before vanishing, leaving the assembled magic users confused and fearful.

In the first issue of Infinite Crisis Aftermath: The Spectre, "Dead Again Part One", the Spectre confronts Crispus Allen. He has come to realize that he needs a host to humanize him in order to know what his mission really means. Allen refuses his request, wanting no further involvement in the Spectre's vigilante work.

The Spectre then leaves Allen for a year (presumably about the same as the year depicted in 52). During that time, Allen sees that he cannot help or communicate with his family, still shattered because Jim Corrigan will not be called to account for Allen's murder. In addition, while the former detective can solve crimes — and even learns Batman's secret identity is Bruce Wayne — he cannot bring the culprits to justice. This includes Corrigan, his own killer.

After a year of being unseen and powerless, Allen receives another visit from the Spectre. This time he finally takes the offer, and becomes the Spectre's human host. Their first mission together is to bring ghoulishly appropriate justice to a child molester. While troubled, Allen is satisfied by the knowledge that "he [the Spectre] needs me more than I need him".

Allen works with the Spectre for a while, choosing whom to visit punishment upon. The Spectre informs Allen there is one more punishment to be enacted before the two can fully bond. Allen sees his killer stumbling out of a bar and revels in the chance to gain revenge. Malcolm Allen, his son, appears and despite Crispus' attempts, kills Corrigan. Crispus then passes judgement on his own son, who dies peacefully in his arms. He thinks this means his son is doomed to hell, but the Spectre explains they just judge, not condemn. Crispus then chooses to fully bond with the Spectre.

In Countdown To Mystery, Allen and the Spectre, accompanied by the spirit of a criminal they killed, set out to foil Eclipso's plans to corrupt superheroes. During the climactic battle between Spectre and Eclipso, Allen realizes that, if the Spectre kills his opponent, it will result in him going down a path of destruction. Allen appeals to Bruce Gordon, who is able to take control of Eclipso.

Final Crisis

The Spectre is one of the main characters in the miniseries Final Crisis: Revelations. The Spectre/Crispus first took vengeance upon Doctor Light for all of his crimes against humanity, then was sent to enact vengeance on Libra for the death of the Martian Manhunter. Libra was somehow unaffected by the Spectre's powers and nearly killed him, but the Spectre used his powers to escape. Afterward, Allen swore that he would no longer do as God said, attempting to revoke his status as the Spectre, but was instead called by God to enact vengeance on his former partner Renee Montoya for her sins. He was stopped in his judgment by Radiant, the Spirit of Mercy, another loyal servant of the Presence tasked with granting God's mercy to repentant beings or those forced to act against their pure intentions. The Radiant admonished Crispus Allen about using his powers in a more responsible way, changing the world as the former host of the Spectre did instead of enacting retribution over one soul at time. Radiant's forgiveness caused Allen to suffer a crisis of faith, demanding to know why Renee was forgiven whereas Allen was forced to kill his own son. Meanwhile, in a world corrupted by Darkseid and the Anti-Life Equation, the Cult of the Stone, a religious sect devoted to the adoration of Cain, used the Spear of Destiny, carelessly misplaced by Allen himself while judging Montoya, to resurrect Cain in the body of Vandal Savage. Cain agreed to lead his forces against the Spectre in retaliation for his curse. Using the Spear of Destiny, Cain stabbed the Spectre and separated him from Allen, effectively killing the human host. The Spectre was placed under Cain's control and Allen's spirit departed the scene and visited his son's grave. When Montoya managed to take the spear from Cain and purify it, freeing the Spectre, Allen willingly returned to his role as its human host after Montoya used the spear to revive his son. United, they defeated Cain and the Cult of Crime. Allen thanked Montoya for her assistance before the Presence called him and the Radiant on to their next mission.

The Spectre and The Radiant are later seen in the final issue of Final Crisis, having been defeated by Mandrakk the Dark Monitor.

A short time later, Crispus assists the immortal adventurer known as Xombi in tracking down the vengeful spirit of a serial killer who is murdering vampires and other supernatural creatures.

Blackest Night

Black Hand reveals that the Spectre must be moved out of the way in order for the universe to be at peace. He sends several black rings to latch onto Crispus' body, transforming him into a Black Lantern, and sealing the Spectre within him. On Coast City, Hal Jordan encounters the Black Lantern Spectre. Using the real Spectre's power to protect itself, it is rendered immune to the combination of Emotional lights that usually destroy Black Lanterns. Hal allows himself to be possessed by Parallax once more in order to stop him. Parallax tears into the Black Lantern's body, freeing the real Spectre and destroying the facsimile. Parallax then attempts to destroy the Spectre, who uses his own power, coupled with the love Carol Ferris feels for Hal, to separate Parallax from its host.

Other versions

Batman: Year 100
In the alternate future limited series Batman: Year 100, there is a scene where James Gordon (the son of Barbara Gordon and the grandson of his namesake) is going through his grandfather's belongings. He briefly finds a photograph of Crispus from 2006, and remarks that he "looks so young".

In other media

Television
Andrew Stewart-Jones portrays Crispus Allen in the Fox TV series Gotham. He appears as a detective at Gotham City Police Department, where he works in the Major Crimes Unit and is partnered with Renee Montoya. He and Montoya initially accuse Gordon for Cobblepot's murder, until the latter shows alive. Crispus later occasionally assists Gordon in fighting Gotham's corruption after he and Renee save Jim from the hitman Victor Zsasz, becoming Gordon's allies. Allen and Montoya didn't return for the show's following seasons.

Film
 Gary Dourdan voices Detective Crispus Allen in the 2008 Warner Premiere animated feature Batman: Gotham Knight in the segments "Crossfire", "In Darkness Dwells", and "Deadshot". He is depicted as the partner of Detective Anna Ramirez. In the film, he originally despised Batman's vigilantism. However, after the Dark Knight saved him and his partner from a gang war between Sal Maroni and the Russian mob, Allen begins to see that Batman's presence is necessary in Gotham, even though he still does not approve of vigilantes. In segment six, Allen is seen acting as the go-between for Batman and Gordon, as word has been received that Gordon has been targeted for assassination, so Allen must inform Batman of the Deadshot threat.
 Crispus Allen is also present in the DC Extended Universe, played by Kobna Holdbrook-Smith.
 In Justice League, Allen discusses sightings of Parademons with Commissioner Gordon, suggesting that Batman may have been the culprit.

Miscellaneous
In the first issue of Batman's debut in Smallville Season 11's comic series, Barbara Gordon/Nightwing mentions eluding cops named "Allen and Montoya".

References

External links
 DC Comics.com listing of Gotham Central vol. 2

Comics characters introduced in 2000
Characters created by Greg Rucka
DC Comics male superheroes
Infinite Crisis
African-American superheroes
Fictional American police detectives
Fictional ghosts
DC Comics television characters
Gotham City Police Department officers